Ville de Berlin was a  74-gun ship of the line of the French Navy.

Career 
Ordered on 24 April 1804 as Thésée, Ville de Berlin was one of the ships built in the various shipyards captured by the First French Empire in Holland and Italy in a crash programme to replenish the ranks of the French Navy. She took her definitive name on 2 July 1807.

She was commissioned on 21 September 1807 and became a part of the Escaut squadron under Vice-Admiral Missiessy. In 1814, she took part in the defence of Antwerp.

At the Bourbon Restoration, she was renamed Atlas and sailed to Brest. Renamed Ville de Berlin during the Hundred Days, she took her name of Atlas back after Napoléon's second abdication.

Struck from the Navy lists on 23 February 1819, she became a storage hulk in Brest.

Notes, citations, and references

Notes

Citations

References

Ships of the line of the French Navy
Téméraire-class ships of the line
1807 ships